KPXP, (97.9 FM). branded as Power 99 FM, is a radio station broadcasting an Adult Album Alternative music format. Licensed to Garapan-Saipan, Northern Mariana Islands, the station is currently owned by Sorensen Pacific Broadcasting Inc.

The station was assigned the KRSI call letters by the Federal Communications Commission on May 31, 1991. The call sign was changed to the current KPXP on May 12, 2014, when the former KPXP on 99.5 (now KZGU) moved from the Northern Mariana Islands to Guam. The new KPXP inherited the station's name and format, explaining its use of the Power 99 name while being on 97.9 MHz.

References

External links
 
 

PXP
Adult album alternative radio stations in the United States
Radio stations established in 1991
1991 establishments in the Northern Mariana Islands
Garapan